Clarence C. Krause was a member of the Wisconsin State Assembly.

Biography
Krause was born on September 9, 1898, in Milwaukee, Wisconsin. He graduated from South Division High School and the University of Wisconsin-Madison.

Career
Krause was elected to the Assembly in 1924. He was a Republican.

References

Politicians from Milwaukee
Republican Party members of the Wisconsin State Assembly
University of Wisconsin–Madison alumni
1898 births
Year of death missing
South Division High School alumni